The Wayden Transportation Ladies Classic, also known as the Abbotsford Ladies was a Grand Slam event  on the Women's World Curling Tour. It was held annually in November in Abbotsford, British Columbia.  It was discontinued after the 2008-09 curling season.

Champions 2005-2008

Champions 2000-2004

2006 Wayden Transportation Ladies Classic
Playoffs

2007 Wayden Transportation Ladies Classic

Playoffs

2008 Wayden Transportation Ladies Classic

Playoffs

Former Grand Slam (curling) events
Sport in Abbotsford, British Columbia
Curling in British Columbia